William Gibb Clarke (3 March 1878 – 1949) was a Scottish professional footballer who played as a winger. Clarke was the first Black professional footballer to score in the English Football League, while playing for Aston Villa in December 1901. He was also the second Black player to represent Scotland, after Andrew Watson, by playing for the Scotland juniors side in 1897.

Early life, ancestry and early career
Born in Mauchline, East Ayrshire to Alexander and Jemima Clark in 1878, his father was born in Georgetown, Demerara, British Guiana. Born William Clark, he would be referred to as Willie Clarke after he moved to England later in his life. Records show that his grandfather Duncan Clark worked as a wood cutter and married a local woman named Cecilia Hutton, with their son Alexander being sent back to Scotland to boarding school. Clarke's family moved to Glasgow in the 1890s when his father found work as an engine fitter. In early 1900 William was listed as an upholsterer in Glasgow's Cathcart Street.

Club career

Scotland
Clarke played for junior clubs Kelburn and Crown Athletic before Scottish Football League side Third Lanark signed him in 1897, some sources also suggest he played for Govan side Benburb. He did not break into the first team there and was registered to non-League sides Arthurlie and East Stirlingshire between 1898 and 1900 while Third Lanark continued to hold his league registration.

England
Clarke attracted interest of a Southern Football League side in 1899 but ultimately signed for East Stirlingshire instead. The following year he did move to the Southern League, joining Bristol Rovers. In over a decade in the Southern Football League and Football League Divisions One and Two, Clarke played for Bristol Rovers, Aston Villa, Bradford City, and Lincoln City. He later played for Croydon Common before retirement in 1912.

In 1901, while playing for Aston Villa, Clarke became the first non-white player to score in the English First Division.

International career
Clarke was called up to the Scotland juniors side in 1897. He played against Ireland in Belfast on 27 March 1897 and contributed to a 3–1 win.

Later life and military service
Having retired from his football in 1912 Clarke served in World War I, being among the first to sign up in August 1914. Willie was initially a Private in the Middlesex Regiment, and later moved regiments to become a Sapper in the Royal Engineers. He served in the theatre of war and was awarded the 1914 Star, Victory Medal and the British War Medal. Following the war he moved to Tunbridge Wells in Kent and worked as an upholsterer, continuing the trade he had learned in Glasgow before his professional football career.

References

1878 births
1949 deaths
Scottish footballers
Benburb F.C. players
Third Lanark A.C. players
Arthurlie F.C. players
East Stirlingshire F.C. players
Bristol Rovers F.C. players
Aston Villa F.C. players
Bradford City A.F.C. players
Scottish Football League players
English Football League players
Association football wingers
Footballers from East Ayrshire
Scottish Junior Football Association players
Black British sportsmen
British Army personnel of World War I
Middlesex Regiment soldiers
Royal Engineers soldiers
People from Mauchline
Scotland junior international footballers